Alfred Hugh Kingon (born May 11, 1931) is an American businessman who served as White House Cabinet Secretary under President Ronald Reagan from 1985 to 1987 and as the United States Ambassador to the European Union from 1987 to 1989.

References

|-

1931 births
Ambassadors of the United States to the European Union
Living people
New York (state) Republicans
20th-century American diplomats